Charles of Provence or Charles II (845 – 25 January 863) was the Carolingian King of Provence from 855 until his early death in 863.

Charles was the youngest son of Emperor Lothair I and Ermengarde of Tours.

His father divided Middle Francia between his three sons: the eldest, Louis, received Italy and the emperorship; Lothair II received Lotharingia (modern Lorraine, the Low Countries, and Upper Burgundy); and the youngest, Charles, received Lower Burgundy.

Charles was only a child when his father died; and the governance of his realm was undertaken by his tutor, Count Girart de Roussillon, whose wife had been a sister-in-law of Lothar I. Girart was a vigorous regent, defending the kingdom from the Northmen, who raided up the Rhone as far as Valence.

Charles' uncle Charles the Bald attempted to intervene in Provence in 861. After receiving an appeal for intervention from the Count of Arles, he invaded Provence, but only reached Macon, being restrained by Hincmar of Rheims.

Charles of Provence never ruled his realm in anything more than name. It was Girart, rather than he, who in 858 arranged that should Charles die without children, Provence would revert to Charles' brother Lothair II. However, when Charles died, his elder brother Louis II also claimed Provence, so the realm was divided between the two: Lothair received the bishoprics of Lyon, Vienne and Grenoble, to be governed by Gerard; Louis II received Arles, Aix and Embrun.

Ancestry

Monarchs of the Carolingian Empire
Medieval child monarchs
9th-century births
863 deaths
9th-century rulers in Europe
Kings of Lower Burgundy
Sons of emperors